The Indian Institute of Management Amritsar (IIM Amritsar) is a Public Business School and an Institute of National Importance located in Amritsar, Punjab, India established by Ministry of Human Resource Development in 2015. It is one of the young members of the Indian Institutes of Management (IIMs) Umbrella established in 2015. The institute was inaugurated by Surjit Singh Rakhra, the then Minister of Higher Education and Languages, Punjab on 6 August 2015.

Campus
IIM Amritsar is temporarily located within the campus of Government Polytechnic College, Amritsar till it moves to its own eco-friendly campus of approximately 60 acres, which is under construction at Manawala on Amritsar-Jalandhar GT Road, in about 3 years time.

Student Accommodation 
The hostel is located at Blessing City, near Guru Ram Das Ji International Airport Amritsar. Students are provided with 3/4 BHK flats with single as well as twin sharing rooms. All basic amenities like WiFi, Geyser, Washing Machine, etc. is provided for each blocks of flats. In addition to these, a recreation room, gymnasium, and a TV room are available in the hostel complex.

Logo 
The geometry and colors in the logo of IIM Amritsar hold specific meanings. According to the institute, the logo is inspired from the "Flower of Life" design located in the Golden Temple, and is modified to pentagonal geometry representing Punjab. While the blue and green elements represent rivers of Punjab and prosperity earned by the hard-working farmers, the five-edged star in the center represents the command over five human senses.

A nationwide public competition was organized on myGOV portal for duration from 18 December 2017 till 19 January 2018 by IIM Amritsar for Logo and moto design. The winners were announced on myGOV blog on 16 September 2019. The logo designed by Mr. Prashant Anant Patil was selected as official logo of IIM Amritsar.

Governance
IIM Amritsar is currently headed by Prof. Nagarajan Ramamoorthy. He is ably assisted by various chairpersons to domains such as Students' Affairs, Placements, MBA Program, Executive Education, etc.

See also 
 Guru Nanak Dev University
 List of institutions of higher education in Punjab

References

External links 

Official website

Amritsar
Business schools in Punjab, India
Education in Amritsar
Educational institutions established in 2015
2015 establishments in Punjab, India